ARIA Number 1 Hits in Symphony is the sixth studio album by Australian pop singer Anthony Callea. It features instrumentation by the Melbourne Symphony Orchestra. The album features a selection of tracks that have peaked at number 1 on the ARIA Charts. The album was announced in June 2017 and was released on 1 September 2017.

Upon announcement, Callea said "[These are] Songs that have not only been part of my musical landscape for the past 30 years but have resonated with so many of us – the ARIA charts don't lie."

Tour
Callea will also perform a one-off show alongside the Melbourne Symphony Orchestra at Hamer Hall in Melbourne on 8 September 2017.
Callea said: "As a singer who craves the art of live performance, I could not think of anyone else I would want to collaborate with than the Melbourne Symphony Orchestra, not only for their grandiose live concert experience, but also a stunning recorded body of work. With one of the finest orchestras in the world conducted by my dear friend and album producer John Foreman and collaborating also with my own incredible band members, these iconic ARIA Number #1 hits will be presented in a way you have never experienced before."

Track listing

Charts

Release history

See also
 List of number-one albums of 2017 (Australia)

References

2017 albums
Anthony Callea albums
Covers albums
Sony Music Australia albums
Melbourne Symphony Orchestra albums